Salles-Mongiscard is a commune in the Pyrénées-Atlantiques department in south-western France. The parish church is dedicated to Saint Laurent.

See also
Communes of the Pyrénées-Atlantiques department

References

Communes of Pyrénées-Atlantiques